Alan Scott Galbraith (born January 7, 1967) is a former American football tight end in the National Football League for the Cleveland Browns, Dallas Cowboys, Washington Redskins, and Green Bay Packers. He was part of the Super Bowl XXVIII championship team over the Buffalo Bills. He played college football at the University of Southern California.

Early years
Galbraith attended Highlands High School in North Highlands, California. As a senior tight end, he posted 34 receptions and 6 touchdowns at tight end, while leading the team in tackles, while also starting on the defensive line. He received All-Northern California honors.

In basketball, he averaged 16 points per game and received league MVP honors as a senior.

College career
Galbraith accepted a football scholarship from the University of Southern California. As a redshirt freshman, he was the third-string tight end behind Erik McKee and Paul Green. As a sophomore, with the graduation of tight end, he was a backup behind Green.

As a junior, he became a starter after replacing an injured Green, registering 21 receptions for 311 yards and 2 touchdowns. 

As a senior, he earned his second consecutive All-Pac-10 honors and was a part of the 1990 Rose Bowl winning team. He finished his college career with 51 receptions for 571 yards and 5 touchdowns.

Professional career

Cleveland Browns
Galbraith was selected by the Cleveland Browns in the seventh round (178th overall) of the 1990 NFL Draft. As a rookie, he was third on the team with 10 special teams tackles. In 1991, he became a regular starter (13 starts) in two tight end formations.

In 1992, he missed the first 2 games in a contract holdout and was relegated to a backup role after the team signed free agent Mark Bavaro. He was waived on August 31, 1993, after Brian Kinchen and Clarence Williams passed him on the depth chart.

Dallas Cowboys (first stint)
On November 11, 1993, he was signed as a free agent by the Dallas Cowboys to replace injured tight ends Jim Price and Alfredo Roberts. He was used as a blocking tight end, helping Emmitt Smith win a third consecutive rushing title with 283 carries for 1,486 yards. He also played on special teams. He was a part of the Super Bowl XXVIII championship team.

During his time with the team, he was mainly used as a backup to Jay Novacek and as a blocker.

Washington Redskins
On May 16, 1995, he signed as a free agent with the Washington Redskins. He started all 16 games and was used mainly as blocking tight end, helping Terry Allen rush for 1,309 yards and 10 touchdowns. Galbraith registered 10 receptions for 80 yards and 2 touchdowns.

In 1996, he started only 6 games, after being passed on the depth chart by Jamie Asher and James Jenkins. He was released on June 4, 1997.

Dallas Cowboys (second stint)
On July 18, 1997, he was signed as a free agent by the Dallas Cowboys to provide depth as the third-string tight end, after the retirement of Jay Novacek and the release of Kendell Watkins. He wasn't re-signed after the season.

Green Bay Packers
On December 23, 1998, he was signed by the Green Bay Packers to provide depth at tight end after Mark Chmura suffered a pulled right calf muscle. He wasn't re-signed after the season.

Personal life
Galbraith is currently the Chaplain of the Sacramento Kings. He is a third generation preacher in the Church of God in Christ, starting with his great-grandfather who founded the first C.O.G.I.C. Church in California (Old Street Church of God in Christ).

References

1967 births
Living people
Sportspeople from Sacramento County, California
Players of American football from California
American football tight ends
USC Trojans football players
Cleveland Browns players
Dallas Cowboys players
Washington Redskins players
Green Bay Packers players
University of Southern California alumni